Miss Grand Thailand is a Thai beauty pageant that has been held annually since 2013 to select who  represent Thailand at Miss Grand International. The pageant has been owned by  Nawat Itsaragrisil since its inception and was previously broadcast on Channel 7 from 2013 – 2019 then instead switched to be aired on One 31 after the pageant ends its partnership with the Channel 7 in 2020.

In the first three editions of the contest, all national entrants were selected by the organization directly. However, after the license was distributed to the provincial organizers in 2016, the pageant has regularly been featuring the contestants chosen by the seventy-seven provincial licensees through their regional competitions, like Miss USA. Since 2017, all seventy-seven provincial representatives must have been being determined through the provincial contests; the national organizer has not been allowing the provincial licensees to appoint their representatives to compete on the national stage, unless with the organization's consent.

The reigning Miss Grand Thailand is Engfa Waraha of Bangkok who was crowned on 31 April 2022 at the Show DC Hall in Bangkok. She represented the country at the Miss Grand International 2022 pageant, in Indonesia on 25 October, where she placed 1st Runner-Up.

History

Background 
Miss Grand Thailand was founded in 2013 by Nawat Itsaragrisil, a television host and producer who had previously served as producer of the beauty pageant Miss Thailand World for BEC-Tero (owner of the television network Channel 3) for seven years until 2012. After ending his role with BEC-Tero, Nawat subsequently established his own pageant, launching Miss Grand Thailand in 2013 in partnership with Channel 7. Its inaugural edition was global broadcast on Let's Veit VTC9 of Vietnam, Arirang TV of South Korea, the FashionTV, as well was Channel 7 of Thailand, then merely on Channel 7 for the subsequent editions. Moreover, the pageant was additionally beamed live to a virtual audience via its official YouTube channel and Facebook webpage for all editions. The winner of Miss Grand Thailand is the country's representative to the international competition Miss Grand International, which was also launched in 2013.

In 2016, Miss Grand Thailand began franchising the provincial competitions to individual organizers, who would name seventy-seven provincial titleholders to compete in the national pageant, and one of the most popular sub-events, the national costume competition, was also introduced for the first time in such the edition; which each of Thailand's seventy-seven provinces has created a unique attire for their candidate to compete in the event, the finalist costumes has regularly been chosen to be worn by the country's representatives in the further international pageants.
Later in 2020, the pageant ended its partnership with Channel 7 due to internal conflicts with one of the acting board executives and switched to broadcasting on One 31 instead. Under Channel 7, the pageant was the most popular in Thailand in terms of television viewership, with ratings ranging from 1.479 to 1.886 during 2017 to 2019. It received ratings of 1.886 compared to its rival pageant Miss Universe Thailand's 1.581 in 2017, the last year the latter was broadcast on Channel 3. The figure dropped to 0.750 in 2020, after it switched to One 31. while Miss Universe Thailand achieved ratings of 0.765 that year, under its new broadcaster PPTV.

Since its inception, the pageant was first postponed in 2020, originally scheduled to be held on 18 June, but, the event was postponed to 19 September due to the COVID-19 pandemic. Furthermore, the 2021 edition, basically planned to happen on 21 August, was also canceled entirely because of the spike of COVID-19 infection in Thailand in mid-2021; the provincial pageants could not be held to elect the representatives for the national contest either. Therefore, the organization decided to designate the first runner-up of the 2020 edition to represent the country in the  competition instead.

Contestant 

Selection of contestants
For the first three inaugural editions of the pageant, the national qualifiers were directly selected by the organization through the audition rounds. However, since the pageant began franchising the provincial competitions to individual organizers responsible for selecting provinces representatives in 2016 then each province holds a preliminary competition annually to choose their delegate for the Miss Grand Thailand pageant.  Moreover, local pageants are also held in some provinces (i.e., Nan and Khon Kaen) to determine delegates for the province competition. The province winners hold the title "Miss Grand (Province)" for the year of their reign and are not permitted to participate in any beauty pageants throughout the year of reign unless with the organization's consent.

In some cases, the licensee is accountable for more than one province such as Pattanasak Yong-Rit, who is responsible for the three southernmost provinces, Pattani, Yala, and Narathiwat, which is the special area that has been being affected by an ongoing ethnic and religious separatist insurgency since 1948. Nevertheless, the license holder could be changed year by year.

Notable contestants
 Amanda Obdam of Phuket (2016): A Thai – Canadian model who won the regional pageant, Miss Grand Phuket 2016, and then represented the province at the Miss Grand Thailand 2016; in which she went on to place in the top ten finalists. Amanda was elected by the organization to compete at Miss Tourism Metropolitan International 2016 in Cambodia, where she won the title. In 2020, she won the Miss Universe Thailand 2020 then consequently represented the country at Miss Universe 2020 in the United States and finished at Top 10 finalists. Moreover, she also served as a mental health ambassador of the Thailand Department of Mental Health, unfortunately, she was disassociated from the position after criticizing the government for allegedly engaging in police brutality at the Thai protests against their pro-military government in early 2021. However, she was instead invited to become the ambassador of a non-governmental organization, the Mirror Foundation of Thailand, focusing on assisting patients with Psychiatric problems who do not have a living place.

Location and Date 
The following is a list of Miss Grand Thailand pageant edition and information, from its inception in 2013.

Main pageant

Ancillary activities 
The pageant ancillary activities are usually consisted of three main subevents namely the best in swimsuit competition, darling of the host round, as well as the national costume parade, which is considered as one of the most popular events. All ancillary events is arranged in the preliminary host provinces (e.g. 2013 in Pattani and 2014 in Buriram) except the national costume parade which is later held at the same venue as the final competition. The winner of each event will be announced on stage of the grand final round in Bangkok. Furthermore, some ancillary challenge winners automatically advanced to the finalists round in the final coronation night or even received a job offer from the affiliated company, for instance, the winner of the Best Voice Award in the 2017 edition was placed in the Top 12 finalists regardless of the accumulation points, the Miss Rising Star winners normally gained an offer to sign the contract as an actress affiliated with Ch 7 or One 31 for three years, and the winner of M Pictures Awards in the 2019 pageant also served as an actress under the management of M Pictures Co., Ltd.
Special award winners

Notes
1.  No swimsuit contest separately held, the winners were determined by the panel of judges during the final competition under the title Miss Being Bodyline in 2013 and Miss Healthy in 2014.
2.  Since 2018, the Best Evening Gown award was renamed to Best Designer award, honored to the designers instead of the province representatives.
3.  In 2019, the Miss Popular Vote award was renamed to People Choice award.

Grand Final 

Since the establishment of the pageant, the final coronation is always held in Bangkok, Thailand's capital city. The twenty quarterfinalists will be announced on the stage after the introduction portion. During 2013 – 2018, all quarterfinalists were chosen from the initial pool of delegates through a closed-door interview, swimsuit round, and the preliminary competition, then the judges selected the ten semi-finalists as well as the five finalists based on their performances on the final stage, as usually done in other pageants. However, a newly established competition system was first introduced in 2019, the contestants were classified under four geographical regions namely; northern, northeastern, central, and southern, regardless of the government administrative regions, each group consisted of 17, 20, 22, and 18 provinces, respectively. Five contestants with the highest preliminary accumulation points from each region advance to the Top 20 round. The judges then select the top 2 candidates from each region (8 in total), based on their swimsuit performance on the stage, to advance to the Top 10 finalists while two other candidates of the Top 10 are determined via mobile application voting and specially chosen by the organizer, regardless of geographical affiliation.

In the semifinalists round (Top 10) of the aforementioned system, the remaining 10 candidates compete in an evening gown and deliver their speeches on assigned topics then the judges select the top five finalists, only one candidate of each group together with the other one which is preferentially selected from the initial pool of Top 10 by the president, advance to the top 5 round and then compete in the question-and-answer portion, where all entrants are asked the same question about the ongoing situations in the country to determine the winner.

All selection process mentioned above is shown in the diagram below.

Titleholders 

Notes
1.  For the 2013 edition, the 5th – 2nd placement was announced as Miss Globe Thailand, Miss Intercontinental Thailand, Miss Supranational Thailand, and 1st runner-up Miss Grand Thailand, respectively.
2.  For the 2014 edition, the 5th – 2nd placement was announced as Miss Tourism Thailand, Miss Intercontinental Thailand, Miss Supranational Thailand, and Miss Earth Thailand, respectively.
3.  For the 2015 edition, the 5th – 2nd placement was announced as First runner-up Miss Grand Thailand, Miss Tourism Thailand, Miss Intercontinental Thailand, and Miss Supranational Thailand, respectively.
4.  For the 2016 edition, the 5th – 2nd placement was announced as Miss Top Model Thailand, Miss Tourisam Thailand, Miss Intercontinental Thailand, and Miss Supranational Thailand, respectively.
Winners gallery

Province by number of wins

National finalists

The following list is the national finalists of the Miss Grand Thailand pageant, as well as the competition results.
Color keys
 Declared as the Winner
 Ended as a Runner-up (Top 5)
 Ended as a Semifinalist (Top10,12)
 Ended as a Quaterfinalist (Top 20)
 Withdrew
 Did not participate

International competition

Current Franchises 
Color keys

Miss Grand International

Miss Intercontinental

The Miss Globe

Miss United Continents

Miss Tourism International

Face of Beauty International

Miss Tourism Queen of the Year International

Miss Tourism Metropolitan International

Miss South East Asia Tourism Ambassadress

Miss Chinese World

Past Franchises 
Color keys

Miss Supranational

Miss Earth

Miss Landscapes International

Top Model of the World

Miss Eco International

Miss Globe International

Controversies

Regional dethronement and license termination 
Since the pageant franchise was distributed to the local organizer in 2016, several incidents of provincial champion dethronement and license cessation have been observed, especially in the first few years of an allotment. It arose from the meticulous regulations of Miss Grand Thailand Ltd., the provincial title holders are not permitted to participate in any beauty pageants throughout the year of reign unless with the organization's consent. In case of regulatory violations, the title would be revoked. Moreover, if the investigation found the director's involvement in such an offense or failure to comply with the contract-specified terms and conditions, the provincial licenses might additionally be terminated.

In 2017, the representative of Satun Province, one of the favorite contenders, was de-titled after participating in another local pageant during her reign, she contended that such a decision was approved by the provincial director; as a result, the license was also ceased. However, the provincial pageant was later held again under the direction of a new franchise holder to select a new representative for the national contest. The candidate from Surin province was dethroned due to the aforementioned circumstances as well. In addition, the organization's investigation found a corrupted issue in the regional pageant of Samut Sakhon Province. Therefore, the competition result was not authenticated and the license was transferred to another organizer, who held the substituted contest to elect the replacement later in Bangkok. Following the national contest completion, the Phatthalung titleholder has subsequently been removed from the provincial title in late November as a result of taking part in the Miss International 2017 pageant in Japan without informing the organization. As well, the candidates from Ang Thong, Amnat Charoen, Nong Khai, Phang Nga, and Mae Hong Son were also relieved from the title after taking part in other local pageants during their reign.

In the 2018 season, merely two provincial title holders were dismissed and received a permanent prohibition to engage in any exhibition related to Miss Grand Thailand Ltd.; namely, the representative of Yasothon and Lampang province forasmuch as both participated in other contests without completing the year of reign. Since then, no incidents of dethronement was encountered.

See also 

 Miss Thailand
 Miss Teen Thailand
 Miss Thailand World
 Miss Universe Thailand
 Miss International Thailand
 Miss Earth Thailand
 Miss Supranational Thailand
 Miss Tiffany's Universe
 Miss Fabulous International
 Mister Thailand
 List of beauty pageants

References 

Beauty pageants in Thailand
Thailand

Recurring events established in 2013
2013 establishments in Thailand